Geoffrey Walter Thom (28 April 1910 – 16 March 1973) was an Australian politician.

He was born in Geelong West to baker William Nathaniel Walter Hamlet Thom and Lily Potter. He attended local state schools and became an accountant. On 13 April 1935 he married Doris May Cortous; they had three children. He served in World War II, and on his return founded his own firm. A member of the Liberal and Country Party, he served on Geelong West City Council from 1946 to 1958 and was mayor from 1955 to 1957. In 1958 he was elected to the Victorian Legislative Council for South Western Province. He was the government whip in the Council from 1964 to 1967. Thom retired in 1970 and died at Manifold Heights in 1973.

References

1910 births
1973 deaths
Liberal Party of Australia members of the Parliament of Victoria
Members of the Victorian Legislative Council
20th-century Australian politicians
Australian military personnel of World War II